Transoxiana or Transoxania ("Land beyond the Oxus") is the Latin name for a region and civilization located in lower Central Asia roughly corresponding to modern-day eastern Uzbekistan, western Tajikistan, parts of southern Kazakhstan, parts of Turkmenistan and southern Kyrgyzstan. Geographically, it is the region between the rivers Amu Darya to its south and the Syr Darya to its north.

The corresponding Chinese term for the region is Hezhong. The Arabic term  (which means "what is beyond the [Jayhūn] river") passed into Persian literary usage and stayed on until post-Mongol times.

The region of Transoxiana was one of the satrapies (provinces) of the Achaemenid Empire of Persia under the name Sogdia. It was defined within the classical world of Persia to distinguish it from Iran proper, especially its northeastern province of Khorasan, a term originating with the Sasanians, although early Arab historians and geographers tended to subsume the region within the loosely defined term "Khorasan" designating a much larger territory. The territories of Khwarazm, Sogdiana, Chaghaniyan, and Khuttal were located in the southern part of Transoxiana; Chach, Osrushana, and Farghana were located in the northern part.

History

Pre-Islamic period

The name Transoxiana stuck in Western consciousness because of the exploits of Alexander the Great, who extended Greek culture into the region with his invasion in the 4th century BCE. Alexander's successors would go on to found the Greco-Bactrian Kingdom, ushering in a distinct Greek cultural presence within Transoxiana that existed for over two hundred years. The city of Ai-Khanoum, situated on the Oxus in northern Afghanistan, remains the only Graeco Bactrian city to have been found and extensively excavated.

During the Sasanian Empire, it was often called Sogdia, a provincial name taken from the Achaemenid Empire, and used to distinguish it from nearby Bactria.

The Chinese explorer Zhang Qian, who visited the neighbouring countries of Bactria and Parthia along with Transoxiana in 126 BCE, made the first known Chinese report on this region. Zhang Qian clearly identifies Parthia as an advanced urban civilisation that farmed grain and grapes, and made silver coins and leather goods. It was ruled successively by Seleucids, the Greco-Bactrian Kingdom, the Parthian Empire and the Kushan Empire before Sassanid rule.

In Sasanian times, the region became a major cultural center due to the wealth derived from the Northern Silk Road. Sassanid rule was interrupted by the Hephthalite invasion at the end of the 5th century and didn't return to the Sassanids until 565.

Islamic period
Many Persian nobles and landlords escaped to this region after the Muslim conquest of Persia. It was also ruled by Göktürks until the Arab conquest between 705 and 715, the area became known by the Arabic phrase Mā warāʼ al-Nahr "what is beyond the river", sometimes rendered as "Mavarannahr".

Transoxiana's major cities and cultural centers are Samarkand and Bukhara. Both are in the southern portion of Transoxiana (though still to the north of the Amu Darya itself, on the river Zarafshan) and Uzbekistan, and the majority of the region was dry but fertile plains. Both cities remained centres of Persian culture and civilisation after the Islamic conquest of Iran, and played a crucial role in the revival of Persian culture with establishment of the Samanid Empire.

Part of this region was conquered by Qutayba ibn Muslim between 706 and 715 and loosely held by the Umayyads from 715 to 738. The conquest was consolidated by Nasr ibn Sayyar between 738 and 740, and continued under the control of the Umayyads until 750, when it was replaced by the Abbasid Caliphate. The Tang dynasty also controlled the eastern part of the region until about the same time, when a civil war known as the An Lushan Rebellion occurred.

In the early Islamic period, the people of Transoxania spoke Sogdian (an Iranian language) and were divided among several principalities. The Arab conquest resulted in the spread of Arabic elite culture, and, more paradoxically, of Persian "as a spoken and eventually written language" in the region. The Arab conquest also resulted in contacts with Tang China, where fragments of the Sasanian ruling elite had taken shelter after Iran's conquest by the Arabs. However, it did not result in Transoxania having major interactions with Chinese culture.

Genghis Khan, founder of the Mongol Empire, invaded Transoxiana in 1219 during his conquest of Khwarezm. Before his death in 1227, he assigned the lands of Western Central Asia to his second son Chagatai, and this region became known as the Chagatai Khanate. In 1369, Timur, of the Barlas tribe, became the effective ruler and made Samarkand the capital of his future empire. Transoxiana was known to be flourishing in the mid-14th century.

Religion
The historian Mark Dickens notes:

Muslims had conquested into Transoxiana by the 7-8th century. There were multiple figures in the Muslim world who had conquered these lands. Some include the Umayyad and Abbasid Arabs that took over lands that are now Uzbekistan, Tajikistan, Kazakhstan, and Kyrgyzstan. 

Transoxania was a great center of Muslim civilization, it was also the centre of the Timurid Empire and there were even leaders like the great Oghuz Khan.

"Oghuz Khan, who could speak at the age of one and whose first word was "Allah." He rebelled against his father, eventually slaying him, before embarking on a series of conquests that brought Islam to all of "Transoxiana and Turkestan."

See also
 Greater Khorasan
 Khwarazm
 Hisar-i Shadman

References

Sources

Further reading

Geography of Central Asia
Historical regions
History of Central Asia
Regions of Asia